Hangu District is a district in Kohat Division of Khyber Pakhtunkhwa province in Pakistan.  The district takes its name from the town of Hangu, which is its administrative centre. The name Hangu may also sometimes be applied to the Miranzai Valley which is partly within the district, bordering the Samana Range.

History
From 1540 to 1893 Hangu was ruled by the 2 Khans of Hangu, the Malak Khails and the Khans of Hangu, the Malak Khails were centrally located in Darsamand and Mammu. Nomads from Afghanistan would travel southwards during the winters however this is not possible after the 1970s due to stricter border controls. Hangu District was created from part of Kohat on 30 June 1996. Its area starts from a village named Khawaja Khizer (Jawzara), which is the boundary between Kohat and Hangu Districts. The last leader or the 13th Khan of Hangu was Muzaffar Khan Bangash, his descendants now live in the district of Khyber Pakhtunkhwa and Hangu. if the Hangu leadership did not conclude. The clan of Bangash was a vast tribe, whose descendants are scattered around in parts of Pakistan; mostly Peshawar and the district of KPK, in Afghanistan where they originated from, and in some parts of Iran and Uttar Pradesh, India. Some have migrated to Western countries for better educations and lives.

Demographics
At the time of the 2017 census the district had a population of 518,811, of which 249,044 were males and 269,732 females. Rural population was 416,309 (80.24%) while the urban population was 102,502 (19.76%). The literacy rate was 43.59% - the male literacy rate was 68.15% while the female literacy rate was 22.52%. 933 people in the district were from religious minorities, mainly Christians. Pashto was the predominant language, spoken by 98.95% of the population.

Administrative divisions
Hangu District is divided into two Tehsils:
 Hangu
 Thall

Villages
 

 Mardukhel Banda

Constituencies
The district comprises two constituencies for the Provincial Assembly of Khyber Pakhtunkhwa.
The Pakistan Muslim League (N) (PML-N) has an overwhelming majority here. NA-9 and now NA-16 have been the stronghold of the party. Maulvi Naimatullah, Syed Ifthikhar Hussain Gilani and Javed Ibrahim Piracha have won consecutively since 1985. In the 2002 elections, PML-N did not run a candidate, but in 2008, Dr. Farooq Bangash, the PML-N NA-16 Candidate, who technically could not contest elections being British Citizen, surrendered to ANP Syed Haider Ali Shah, who won marginally from Muttahida Majlis-e-Amal (MMA). Basically it was Bangash's strategy to ensure Pir Haider win. Now the majority and whole control for PTI, In Local body election PTI also gain the main power, and there is still strong opposition of JUI.

National Assembly 
This district is represented by one elected MNA (Member of National Assembly) in Pakistan National Assembly. Its constituency is NA-16. Since 2002: NA-16 (Hangu)

Provincial Assembly

Education
Various public and private schools and colleges exist in district of Hangu. Hangu population is near by 0.8 million people and they demand for university in 2013. Agriculture University campus was to be built in Hangu City but still the project is in pending while funds transfer to Charsada University during ANP government. Recently the government degree college Hangu start BS Hons 4-year program under Kohat University of Science and Technology.

See also

 Khyber Pakhtunkhwa
 Dallan, Khyber Pakhtunkhwa

References

Further reading

 
Districts of Khyber Pakhtunkhwa